Sergei Prokofiev's Piano Concerto No. 4 in B-flat major for the left hand, Op. 53, was commissioned by the one-armed pianist Paul Wittgenstein and completed in 1931.

It was the only one of Prokofiev's complete piano concertos that never saw a performance during his lifetime.  It was premiered in Berlin on 5 September 1956 by Siegfried Rapp and the West Berlin Radio Symphony Orchestra, conducted by Martin Rich.  The United States premiere was in 1958, by Rudolf Serkin and the Philadelphia Orchestra under Eugene Ormandy. The British premiere was in 1961, by Malcolm Binns.

Prokofiev expressed some interest in making an arrangement for piano two-hands and orchestra, but never went through with this idea.

Structure

The four movements last around 25 minutes:
 Vivace (4–5 mins.)
 Andante (8–13 mins.)
 Moderato (8–9 mins.)
 Vivace (1–2 mins.)
The outer movements serve in a way as prelude and postlude, with the middle two comprising the bulk of the concerto. The Andante is reflective and makes rhetorical use of the strings, expanding with Romantic grandness. The remarkable third movement in modified sonata form, punctured and playful — some have said “sarcastic” — offers arresting, emphatic dialogs between the piano and the percussion section; it is marked Moderato and to be effective must be played strictly as such: not the least bit hurried. The Vivace ends abruptly, with the piano running up pianissimo to a high B-flat7.

Instrumentation
The work is scored for solo piano (left hand), 2 flutes, 2 oboes, 2 clarinets, 2 bassoons, 2 horns, 1 trumpet, 1 trombone, bass drum and strings.

Recordings

References

External links
 

Piano concertos by Sergei Prokofiev
Commissions by Paul Wittgenstein
1931 compositions
Compositions in B-flat major
Concertos for piano left-hand and orchestra